SS-Green Light Racing is an American professional stock car racing team that currently competes in the NASCAR Xfinity Series, fielding the No. 07 Chevrolet Camaro full-time for Blaine Perkins and the No. 08 car full-time for Gray Gaulding. They have a technical alliance with Richard Childress Racing.  
The team is owned by former driver Bobby Dotter, who also drove for the team in numerous races when he was still driving. Dotter is currently the team's sole owner, although at various points in the team's history, businessman Ken Smith (who left the team in July 2017) and Steve Urvan (in 2010 only) as well as Texas politician Gene Christensen (who unsuccessfully ran in the Republican primary for Texas's 4th congressional district in 2008) were co-owners of the team with Dotter.

Green Light began competing in the Truck Series in 2000 and merged with SS Racing in 2008 during the economic downturn after teams merging was a common thing at the time which resulted in financial success and stability. SS Racing was a team that was competing in the ASA and had previously partnered with Green Light's Truck team on various occasions, but fully merged with GLR beginning that year.

The team competed in the Truck Series each year until 2017 when they decided to focus on their Xfinity program.

Xfinity Series

Car No. 07/76 history

In 2016, the team announced that they would field the No. 07 full-time for Ray Black Jr. with sponsorship from ScubaLife.com in all the races. He picked up 9 top-20 finishes, with a best finish of 14th in Bristol (August). He finished 19th in the driver standings. Black returned to the No. 07 for 2017 but was replaced with Todd Bodine for Charlotte. It was later announced that Spencer Boyd and Andy Lally would drive at Pocono and Mid-Ohio respectively.

On October 19, 2017, it was announced that Spencer Boyd would drive the No. 76 Chevrolet Camaro full-time in 2018 for SSGLR. This would end up being the No. 07 team renumbered. The No. 76 came from sponsor Grunt Style's slogan/logo, which has the year 1776 on it because they sell Americana-themed products. Boyd would finish the year 26th in the final point standings.

Boyd left for a Truck Series ride with Young's Motorsports for 2019, and Black Jr. returned to the team from a part-time ride with B. J. McLeod Motorsports to replace Boyd and would compete full-time again, and the car was renumbered back to the No. 07. He was announced to return to the team for the 2020 season as well.

On May 23, 2020, Black Jr. announced that he would no longer be driving the No. 07 in order to concentrate on helping his family business, the CDA Technical Institute, recover after it experienced financial problems due to the COVID-19 pandemic. After Black's departure, it was announced that Rick Ware Racing had cut a deal with SS-Green Light to field some of their drivers in the No. 07 for the remainder of the season. This began with Garrett Smithley in the car for Charlotte and Carson Ware, Rick's son, making his series debut at Bristol.
The team’s highlight of the year was when Gray Gaulding wheeled the 07 car to a 2nd-place finish at Daytona International Speedway when the top 4 wrecked on the final corner. Garrett Smithley scored a top 10 at Talladega, and Jade Buford scored a top-10 at Charlotte.

In 2021, Joe Graf Jr. ran most the races in the #07 with Ross Chastain, J. J. Yeley and Josh Bilicki making appearances in the No. 07 throughout the season. Graf scored a top-ten finish in the Sparks 300.

SS Green-Light Racing switched from running Chevrolets to Fords in 2022. Graf will be the primary driver in the No. 07 once again.

On February 26, 2022, Cup Series driver Cole Custer claimed the team’s first victory, which came at Auto Club Speedway. The entry was a collaborative effort between the team and Stewart-Haas Racing. On October 4, Truck Series driver Hailie Deegan announced she would make her Xfinity Series debut in the No. 07 at Las Vegas.

For 2023 SS Green-Light Racing switched back to Chevrolet from Ford and revealed Blaine Perkins would drive the No. 07 full-time.

Car No. 07/76 results

Car No. 08 history

In 2018, it was announced that Gray Gaulding would drive the 08 full-time in 2019. In April's MoneyLion 300 at Talladega Superspeedway, Gaulding finished a career-best second.

On January 16, 2020, it was announced that Joe Graf Jr. would drive the No. 08 car for the 2020 season, replacing Gaulding. He moved up from the ARCA Menards Series, where he drove the No. 77 for Chad Bryant Racing full-time for two years. Graf started out the season with Core Development Group sponsorship but signed a multi-year deal with Bucked Up Energy before Homestead-Miami. He posted a best finish of 13th thrice, and wound up 22nd  in points, respectfully.

The No. 08 returned in 2022, with the team signing David Starr for 28 races. Graf would also drive the No. 08 in select races, beginning in the Production Alliance Group 300. On March 29, DGM Racing sold the No. 92's owners points to the SS Green Light Racing's No. 08 so it would be more likely to qualify.

Car No. 08 results

Car No. 15 history
SSGLR partnered with the No. 15 team of Rick Ware Racing to have Ray Black Jr. drive that car at Texas in November. In that race, which was his Xfinity Series debut, Black Jr. finished 27th. Jimmy Weller III and B. J. McLeod also ran one race each in No. 15.

Car No. 55/77/90 history
In April 2014, the team announced a partnership with Viva Motorsports to field the No. 55 car usually run by Jamie Dick in select races. The team was fielded in the races that Viva wasn't using the No. 55 car. SS-Green Light's Nationwide Series program debuted on April 11 at Darlington Raceway with veteran Todd Bodine. Jimmy Weller III made his series debut the next week at Richmond, finishing 40th after a mechanical failure. Bodine ran a second race at Dover. Timmy Hill, Andy Lally, Caleb Roark and David Starr all ran single races for the team.

In July, Brennan Newberry made his Nationwide Series debut at Loudon in a partnership with NTS Motorsports and sponsor Qore-24. Newberry ran three races in the No. 55 with a best finish of 19th at Watkins Glen.

Brennan Newberry made his fourth Xfinity career start with SS-Green Light/NTS Motorsports at Phoenix in the fall, now driving the No. 77 Qore24 Chevrolet, since Viva Motorsports was running the 55 car that race. Newberry finished 36th after an early crash.

For 2015, the team allied with King Autosport and changed the number to No. 90. It ran on weeks King Autosport wasn't using the No. 90 car. The team partnered with Rick Ware Racing to field the car in a few races, similar to the No. 15. Jimmy Weller III and Todd Bodine drove the No. 90 in four races each. Andy Lally drove two races, B. J. McLeod, Tyler Young and Korbin Forrister all ran single races for the team. In 2016, the team helped King Autosport to field the car in two races, one with Bodine at Watkins Glen and Lally at Mid-Ohio.

Car No. 99/35 history

In 2017, SS-Green Light collaborated with B. J. McLeod Motorsports to jointly field McLeod's No. 99 car, with David Starr driving it for the full season. For the summer Daytona race only, Korbin Forrister was scheduled to replace Starr in the No. 99, but got the flu, and Starr ended up driving his normal car anyhow. In that race, Starr ended up getting a top-5 finish, the only one of the season for both him and the team. The partnership ended in 2018, with Starr moving to the Jimmy Means Racing No. 52, and McLeod fielding the No. 99 by themselves in 2018, and SS-Green Light would switch the partnership for their second team to the Go Green Racing No. 35 of Joey Gase.

Car No. 99/35 results

Truck Series

Truck No. 07 history

The No. 07 truck began racing in 2001 with the former owner Gene Christensen driving the Racing For Kids Chevrolet. He failed to finish higher than 30th that season and completed just 63 laps total. Aaron Daniel and Mike Olsen drove the No. 07 for a total of three races that season in addition. Jason Small began racing the No. 07 full-time the following season with Sunbelt Rentals sponsoring. He had two top-tens and finished 22nd in the points standings. Rich Bickle drove the No. 07 at the season opener in 2003, before Bobby Dotter drove for several races in the truck. Jeremy Mayfield had a sixth-place finish the following race at Lowe's, with Stan Boyd and Blake Mallory driving in select races afterward. Johnny Chapman would then drive for six races, with Ryan Hanson and Mark McFarland driving in between. Dotter and Shane Sieg would finish out the year in the truck. Ricky Moxley drove the No. 07 truck for the Lucas Oil Camping world truck series in INDY.

In 2004, Sieg was hired as the full-time driver with Auto Air Colors sponsoring. Despite an eighth-place finish at Milwaukee, he was released before the final quarter of the season, and Sean Murphy and Andy Houston would end the season in the truck. Murphy would be hired to drive the No. 07 for the first five races of the season, and after one thirteenth-place finish, Butch Miller took over at Mansfield, and finished tenth. Rich Bickle, Chris Wimmer and Eric Norris also raced the No. 07, before Jack Bailey drove a total of six races, with a best finish of 26th. Chase Pistone, José Luis Ramírez and Wimmer finished out the season in the truck. Murphy returned at the beginning of the 2006 season but did not last long, with Clint Bowyer finishing seventh at Martinsville in the Jack Daniel's truck. Justin Martz, Robert Turner, Johnny Chapman and Butch Miller drove one race apiece, with Kevin Lepage driving a pair of races with Roadloans.com sponsorship. Chad McCumbee drove the No. 07 for a pair of races, when U.S. Restoration became the team's new primary sponsor. Travis Kittleson then became the team's new driver for three races, his best a sixteenth at Nashville Superspeedway. T. J. Bell would drive for one race, and John Mickel brought sponsorship from Torquespeed and leased out the No. 07 for the rest of the season, his best finish 20th.

After the 2006 season, Tim Sauter and Lester Buildings joined the team for 2007. Despite only one top-ten finish, Sauter finished 16th in the points but was runner up to Willie Allen for Rookie of the Year. Both Sauter and Lester Buildings departed at the season's end, possibly due to the struggles of the housing market. Shane Seig, Sean Murphy, and Ryan Lawler shared the ride in 2008 with ASI Limited.

In 2009, Chad McCumbee returned to SS Green Light Racing to drive the No. 07 in 21 races. With part-time sponsorship from Tiwi and Valvoline, he had five top-ten finishes and finished 19th in points. Jason Young and Burt Myers filled in the rest of the schedule. Sean Murphy opened the 2010 season by finishing 13th at Daytona with Dietz & Watson sponsoring. For the rest of the season, Donny Lia and Tony Jackson split the driving duties, with Jackson scheduled to run 7 races. After a long string of bad luck, Lia departed the No. 07 team after the O'Reilly 200 at Bristol.

For 2011, the team swapped between Toyota and Chevrolet. Donnie Neuenberger drove at Daytona and B. J. McLeod drove at Phoenix with Boggy Creek Airboat Rides. Johnny Chapman drove a few races in the truck, mostly as a start and park. In 2012 the 07's lineup added on former Pro Cup driver Jeff Agnew, as well as T. J. Duke.

For 2015, Ray Black Jr.  piloted the car full-time with the sponsorship ScubaLife.com. He finished 12th in the points standings in 2015, including a 5th-place finish at Daytona.

For 2016, Black Jr. moved to the Xfinity Series, and the team had multiple drivers throughout the season, starting with French driver Michel Disdier at Daytona with Pray For Paris as his sponsor. He finished 11th after avoiding 2 big ones.

In 2017, SS-Green Light decided to close down their Truck team to focus on competing in the Xfinity Series, and they sold their equipment and owner points to Rick Ware Racing, which fielded the No. 12 truck that year.

Truck No. 08 history

The current No. 08 truck debuted in 2007 as the No. 0 with Sharon Rice listed as the owner. Brandon Knupp drove it first at Texas Motor Speedway, and finished 34th after suffering overheating. Three weeks later, Wayne Edwards drove the truck and finished last with a braking malfunction. In 2008, the No. 0 ran a part-time schedule with Christensen as the owner. Butch Miller drove most of the races, with two 32nd-place finish, along with Wayne Edwards, Chris Jones, Mike Olsen, Norm Benning, Johnny Chapman and Kevin Lepage.

The truck did not return until 2010 as the 21 and Steve Urvan as the owner. Donny Lia began the season in the ride, later moving to the No. 07 with Tony Jackson. The No. 21 would then be fielded as a 'start and park' truck with Johnny Chapman, Butch Miller and Chris Eggleston sharing the ride. Jake Crum made his NCWTS debut in the No. 21 at the Bristol Motor Speedway on August 18, 2010, during the O'Reilly 200. Crum qualified 13th and ran well early in the event, but fell victim to a broken fuel pump midway through the event. The truck was later taken over at the EnjoyIllinois.com 225 by David Starr who had left Randy Moss Motorsports the week prior due to lack of performance and the decision to have the No. 81 miss Chicago and Kentucky. Starr drove the No. 21 Chevrolet to a top-10 finish at Chicagoland. The No. 81 and Zachry sponsorship were then moved over from Moss Motorsports, and Starr drove the truck for the rest of the season to a 9th-place finish in points. In 2011, Starr and the team struggled to keep up, scoring 8 top-10s and finishing 13th in points. Starr then left to join Arrington Racing. The truck number was changed back to the No. 08 and was driven by Florida native Ross Chastain in 2012. Chastain scored a 3rd-place finish at Bristol, as well as 3 top 10s. Sometimes in the season, he had to start and park, due to lack of funds. he would end his season 17th in points. Chastain would later depart for Brad Keselowski Racing and would be replaced by the returning David Starr for 2013, changing back to No. 81. Starr would only run the first seven races before sponsorship issues forced him to sit out most of the season.

For 2014, the team reverted to No. 08 Chevrolet Silverado. Jimmy Weller III opened the season with a 9th-place finish at Daytona. In 2015, Korbin Forrister took over the driving duty of the No. 08 Chevrolet Silverado in a partnership with B. J. McLeod Motorsports.

In 2016, the No. 08 team shut down, and Forrister moved to Lira Motorsports No. 59 truck. SS-Green Light would only field the No. 07 that year, which was their last one in the Truck Series.

Truck No. 23 history
Green Light Racing began competing in 2000 with Dotter driving the No. 45 People Against Drugs Chevrolet in two races, with a best finish seventeenth at The Milwaukee Mile. For the 2001 season, Dotter would drive the 08 full-time while campaigning for Rookie of the Year. He had a 10th-place finish at IRP and finished fifteenth in points. He continued to drive the 08 truck in 2002, posting four top-ten finishes and finishing a career-best fourteenth in points. In 2003, rookie Jody Lavender was hired as the team's driver for most of the season, bringing sponsorship from Lavender's Discount Carpets and Hartsville Community Bank. He finished seventeenth in points that year despite missing four races. He was replaced in those races by Dotter and Shane Sieg, who ran two races apiece.

Ken Weaver was hired as the next driver of the 08 truck in 2004, bringing 1-800-4-A-Phone as sponsorship, and he raced a total of fifteen times, with a best finish of 18th at Texas Motor Speedway. Various other drivers raced the 08 truck that season, including Dotter, Tony Raines, A. J. Fike, Butch Miller, Bill Manfull and Sean Murphy. Weaver started driving the 08 truck for the first three races in 2005, and had a sixth-place finish at Daytona International Speedway before he left the team. Without a primary sponsor, the team began racing with the driver-by committee schedule, and Tam Topham drove for the team at Martinsville Speedway, before Rich Bickle drove the next two races, and finished fifth at Mansfield. Butch Miller and Kevin Lepage drove one race apiece, before Johnny Chapman drove in four of the next five races. Miller and Topham raced another time in the 08 that year, along with Jarit Johnson, Chris Wimmer, Mark McFarland and Jack Bailey.

In 2006, Bobby Hamilton Jr. raced in the first three races of the season with Corky's BBQ and Ribs sponsoring the team's Dodge, before he left to drive full-time for his father's team. Butch Miller drove the next week at Martinsville, and Boris Jurkovic followed at the following race, when the team returned to Chevrolet. Mike Greenwell made his debut at Mansfield, finishing 26th, and after Johnny Chapman drove at Dover, Chad McCumbee was hired as Green Light Racing's first full-time driver in two years. Except for two races where Chris Wimmer and Mike Greenwell raced, McCumbee drove the 08 for the rest of the season, posting two seventh-place finishes, and was runner-up for Rookie of the Year despite missing the season opener at Daytona. He was hired to race the 08 for the 2007 season, skipping the Sam's Town 400 due to making his NEXTEL Cup debut at Pocono Raceway, being replaced by Eric Norris. He left for MRD Motorsports late in the season, and Shane Sieg took his place, for a couple of races, with Dennis Setzer driving at New Hampshire. Chris Jones took over the ride starting at Martinsville. For 2008, Jason White brought sponsorship from GunBroker.com, along with the team's manufacturer change to Dodge. They did not have any top-ten finishes and ended the season nineteenth in points. Butch Miller became the team's primary driver in 2009, with Johnny Chapman, Lepage, Murphy, and Brandon Knupp filling in. The team ran completed races with Tim Brown, Chrissy Wallace, Jamie Dick and Brett Butler. White returned to the truck in 2010, changing the number from 08 to 23, and the team had their best season. White won the pole at Daytona and was in the top five in points for half of the season. However, the team's performance dropped and they took home a 10th-place finish in points. White left the team for the upstart Joe Denette Motorsports for 2011.

Other Truck teams
Beginning with the 2006 season, Green Light Racing began fielding a third team when the expected field was short. Wayne Edwards drove the 03 truck first in 2006, finishing 36th and 35th respectively. Johnny Chapman then drove at Texas Motor Speedway, finishing 35th. Chapman drove the 78 at Atlanta in 2007, finishing last. Other drivers of the 06 truck in 2007 were Morgan Shepherd, Blake Mallory, Randy MacDonald, Dotter, Edwards, and Brandon Knupp.

References

External links
 
  (older version, last updated in 2015)
  (Bobby Dotter)
  (Gene Christensen)
  (Ken Smith)
  (Steve Urvan)

2000 establishments in the United States
American auto racing teams
Companies based in North Carolina
NASCAR teams